Tsaris Pass is a mountain pass west of Maltahöhe, Namibia, on C19 road through the Tsaris Mountains in the Namib Desert in the direction of Sossusvlei, Sesriem, and Solitaire. Although the road has a grade of 1:18, it is unsuitable for trailers.

References 
 Dangerouse Roads entry

Mountain passes of Namibia